Howearion belli, also known as the beautiful semislug, is a species of semislug that is endemic to Australia's Lord Howe Island in the Tasman Sea.

Description
The shell of the mature animal is 6.5–8.1 mm in height, with a diameter of 13–16.6 mm, ear-shaped with rounded, rapidly expanding whorls, and with flattened spire and apex. It is smooth, glossy and deep golden-brown in colouration. The umbilicus is closed. The aperture is ovately lunate. The animal is cream, brown, or reddish-brown, with darker brown stripes and spots and tiny white flecks.

Distribution and habitat
The semislug occurs on the summits and upper slopes of the southern mountains of the island, where it is found in leaf litter, usually dead palm fronds, and sometimes in living trees.

References

 
 

 
belli
Gastropods of Lord Howe Island
Taxa named by Tom Iredale
Gastropods described in 1944